Route 82 is an east–west state highway in Connecticut running for  from Route 9 in Chester to Route 2 and 32 in Norwich.

Route description

Route 82 begins at a trumpet intersection with Route 9 at exit 7 in Chester and heads northeast into Haddam as a super two to an intersection with Route 154. The two routes briefly overlap before Route 82 continues east to the East Haddam Bridge over the Connecticut River, entering East Haddam near Goodspeed Opera House. On the east end of the village, it intersects the southern end of Route 149 At a junction with the south end of Route 151, Route 82 turns southeast  and enters  Lyme, where it turns east once again at a junction with the east end of Route 148.  It then reenters East Haddam, where it passes the western end of Route 156 before entering Salem.  In Salem, Route 82 continues northeast, meeting the south end of the Route 11 expressway, then meeting Route 85 at a traffic circle, which acts as a default extension of the Route 11 expressway for New London and shoreline bound traffic.  After passing the southern end of Route 354, Route 82 continues east into Montville, overlapping for 0.12 miles with Route 163.  After briefly clipping Bozrah, it enters Norwich.  In Norwich, it intersects Interstate 395 (I-395) at exit 11 before ending at a triangular one-way couplet in downtown Norwich, intersecting Routes 2 and 32 over two bridges across the Yantic River.

Route 82 is a designated scenic road for the length of the East Haddam Bridge between Haddam and East Haddam.

History 
Modern Route 82 east of Route 85 was built along the alignment of an early toll road known as the Salem and Norwich Turnpike, which was chartered in 1827 to connect its namesake cities. The toll road was extended west to the village of Hadlyme in 1834 by another turnpike corporation, which built the Hadlyme and Salem Turnpike. The road between East Haddam and Norwich, incorporating both turnpike alignments, was designated in 1922 as State Highway 153. In the 1932 state highway renumbering, old Highway 153 was renumbered to Route 82. The only major changes since then are the extension along a new limited access road west of Route 154 to a trumpet intersection with Route 9 in 1971, and a reorganization of the east terminus in Norwich in the late 1980s.

Junction list

References

External links

082
Transportation in Middlesex County, Connecticut
Transportation in New London County, Connecticut